A Civil Contract is a Regency romance novel by Georgette Heyer, first published in 1961. Set in 1814–1815, it is also a historical novel and follows the general pattern of storytelling of Heyer's other novels. The romantic plot centers on a viscount who  reluctantly enters a marriage of convenience with a wealthy merchant's daughter.

Plot summary
A modest nobleman, whose deceased father bankrupted the estate, becomes guardian to three younger siblings. Forced to break a betrothal to a beautiful noblewoman, he allows the lady's father to introduce him to a wealthy merchant who aspires to a noble husband for his daughter. With full awareness by all parties, the arranged marriage is quickly accomplished. How will the new couple fare when their lives continue to intersect with that of the husband's erstwhile fiancee?

More plot details (with spoilers) 
Viscount Lynton comes home to find himself the heir to debts after the death of his father. With a mother and two sisters to support, and lacking any means of restoring his family's wealth, he is facing disaster.  When he visits his solicitor to discuss selling the family home, a marriage of convenience is suggested as an alternative. Though reluctant, Lynton meets with Mr Chawleigh, a common Cit, and with Jenny, his plain and exquisitely shy daughter, and eventually agrees to be married. It is a simple contract; Jenny gains a title and Lynton receives enough money to take care of his family obligations and save his estate.  However, he remains in love with Julia Oversley, who is the exact opposite of Jenny. While Julia is ethereally beautiful and elegant, Jenny is plain and dowdy. The marriage is not a very happy one, although Jenny, who has been secretly in love with Lynton for a long time, tries to make his life as comfortable as she can. In turn, Lynton, who is an honorable gentleman, resolves to bury his feelings for Julia and protect his new wife as he launches her into society.  His father-in-law, Mr Chawleigh, is well-meaning but lacks the social graces with which Lynton is familiar and thereby makes it difficult for Lynton to forget he is in his debt.  The young man often wishes he were free of his obligations to him.

A veteran of the Peninsular War (1808–1814), Lynton has followed the exile and return of Napoleon with keen interest. Having read about the forthcoming battle in Belgium, he decides to gamble on the stock exchange. His personal involvement with previous battles lead him to the conviction that Wellington will not lose, so rather than take his father-in-law's advice to sell his funds he gambles on victory. And, as he had foreseen, shares plummet, only to soar again at the news of Wellington's victory at Waterloo (1815). Lynton has made his fortune, and no longer needs his father in law's financial support. However, Jenny's pregnancy and confinement have brought the two men to a greater understanding of one another. Rather than insult Chawleigh by repaying him, he suggests that the property titles held by Chawleigh be passed on directly to his newborn grandson.  Lynton's final act of including Chawleigh as one of the newborn's names, is a mark of respect that delights the older man.

In the meantime, Julia has married an older and wealthy suitor. Lynton realizes that he is happier and more comfortable with devoted Jenny than he would ever have been with beautiful but self-centered and demanding Julia.

The novel ends with Jenny realizing that Lynton genuinely loves her, albeit with a calmer affection than the youthful passion that characterised his feelings for Julia Oversley.

References

External links
Review of A Civil Contract by Jo Walton

1961 British novels
Novels by Georgette Heyer
Historical novels
Fiction set in 1814
Fiction set in 1815
Heinemann (publisher) books
Regency romance novels